The Georgian Orthodox Church is a major part of Orthodox Christianity in Azerbaijan. Georgian Churches in Azerbaijan are under jurisdiction of Eparchy of Khornabuji and Hereti.

Churches

See also 
Christianity in Azerbaijan

References 

 
Eastern Orthodoxy in Azerbaijan
Georgian Orthodox Church